Tom Carr was the City Attorney of Boulder, Colorado from 2010 to 2021. He managed an office of 17 people, and received a salary of $170,000 per year.

He formerly served as Seattle City Attorney from 2002 to 2009. He is remembered for founding the Community Court (giving repeat petty criminals access to treatment), and supporting an extensive undercover operation (Operation Sobering Thought) against underage drinking. He was defeated in 2009, receiving 38% of the vote to Pete Holmes' 62%.

Prior to his career in public service, Carr was a partner at Barrett Gilman & Ziker (specializing in commercial litigation), an Assistant United States Attorney in the Eastern District of New York (specializing in organized crime), and Chairman of the Elevated Transportation Company Council (planning the Seattle Center Monorail, during which time he became close friends with future-mayor Greg Nickels). He received his bachelor's degree from St. Johns University and his Juris Doctor from New York Law School. He was born in The Bronx.

References

Living people
New York Law School alumni
St. John's University (New York City) alumni
Washington (state) city attorneys
21st-century American lawyers
Colorado city attorneys
Year of birth missing (living people)